This is the discography for the work of rock band Throwing Muses.

Albums

Studio albums

Live albums

Compilation albums

EPs

Singles

References

Discographies of American artists
Discography
Rock music group discographies